Kevin Krawietz and Andreas Mies were the defending champions but chose not to defend their title.

Ariel Behar and Gonzalo Escobar won the title after defeating Guido Andreozzi and Andrés Molteni 3–6, 6–4, [10–3] in the final.

Seeds

Draw

References

External links
 Main draw

AON Open Challenger - Doubles
2019 Doubles
AON